Echo Party is a mixtape by American hip hop musician Edan. It was released via Five Day Weekend on November 23, 2009. It peaked at number 98 on Billboards Top R&B/Hip-Hop Albums chart.

Production
Edan was given access to the Traffic Entertainment Group vault of old school hip hop to create the album, resulting in a single 29-minute track two years later. It was recorded using tape echo, guitar, and kazoo, among other instruments.

Release
Echo Party was released on CD and vinyl. The vinyl release comes in a white sleeve, each with unique stencil and stamp artwork handmade by Edan, and is limited to 1000 copies.

Critical reception

At Metacritic, which assigns a weighted average score out of 100 to reviews from mainstream critics, Echo Party received an average score of 71, based on 10 reviews, indicating "generally favorable reviews".

Rick Anderson of AllMusic said, "you'll hear vintage hip-hop basslines, 808 beats, and exuberant '80s-style rapping interspersed with weirdness like chopped-up Latin rhythms and shout-outs to New York boroughs and zodiac signs." Adam Kennedy of BBC called it "a production album over mere mixtape, one for the breakdancers, as well as appreciators of both forward-thinking and back-in-the-day craft." Nate Patrin of Pitchfork commented that "if you've ever wanted to hear classic cuts from the dawn of hip hop turned into hallucinogenic setpieces that knock and clang like glitched-up King Tubby, Echo Party should justify whatever the hell it is Edan's been doing with his time over the past four years."

Dave Segal of The Stranger included it on the "2009's Top Overlooked Releases" list.

Track listing

Personnel
Credits adapted from liner notes.

 Edan – recording, mixing, concept, art direction, design
 Mark Donahue – mastering
 Trevor "Karma" Gendron – layout
 Matt Welch – executive production

Charts

References

External links
 

2009 mixtape albums
Edan (musician) albums
DJ mix albums